The 2017 BOOST National was held from November 14 to 19 at the Essar Centre in Sault Ste. Marie, Ontario. This was the third Grand Slam of Curling event of the 2017–18 curling season.

Many of the top European teams on the World Curling Tour could not attend, as they are playing in the 2017 European Curling Championships while the top American teams on the Tour are playing in the 2017 United States Olympic Curling Trials.

In the men's final, Team Bruce Mouat from Scotland won their first career Grand Slam title against the South Korean Olympic team, skipped by Kim Chang-min, who was playing in their first Grand Slam ever. The final was only the second men's final to not feature a Canadian team, and Mouat became the second non-Canadian skip to win a men's Grand Slam event and at the age of 23, became the youngest men's skip ever to win a Grand Slam event, eclipsing John Morris who won the 2004 Players' Championship at the age of 25.

In the women's final, the defending Olympic champion Jennifer Jones and her Winnipeg rink defeated Lethbridge's Casey Scheidegger to win her 15th career grand slam, her second in a row.

Men

Teams

Round-robin standings

Final round-robin standings

Round-robin results
All draw times are listed in Eastern Time (UTC−05:00).

Draw 1
Tuesday, November 14, 4:30 pm

Draw 2
Tuesday, November 14, 8:00 pm

Draw 3
Wednesday, November 15, 8:30 am

Draw 4
Wednesday, November 15, 12:00 pm

Draw 5
Wednesday, November 15, 4:00 pm

Draw 6
Wednesday, November 15, 8:00 pm

Draw 8
Thursday, November 16, 12:00 pm

Draw 10
Thursday, November 16, 8:00 pm

Draw 12
Friday, November 17, 12:00 pm

Draw 13
Friday, November 17, 4:00 pm

Tiebreakers
Friday, November 17, 8:00 pm

Playoffs

Quarterfinals
Saturday, November 18, 5:00 pm

Semifinals
Saturday, November 18, 9:00 pm

Final
Sunday, November 19, 12:00 pm

Women

Teams

Round-robin standings

Final round-robin standings

Round-robin results
All draw times are listed in Eastern Time (UTC−05:00).

Draw 1
Tuesday, November 14, 4:30 pm

Draw 2
Tuesday, November 14, 8:00 pm

Draw 3
Wednesday, November 15, 8:30 am

Draw 4
Wednesday, November 15, 12:00 pm

Draw 5
Wednesday, November 15, 4:00 pm

Draw 6
Wednesday, November 15, 8:00 pm

Draw 7
Thursday, November 16, 8:30 am

Draw 9
Thursday, November 16, 4:00 pm

Draw 11
Friday, November 17, 8:30 am

Draw 12
Friday, November 17, 12:00 pm

Playoffs

Quarterfinals
Saturday, November 18, 1:00 pm

Semifinals
Saturday, November 18, 9:00 pm

Final
Sunday, November 19, 4:00 pm

Notes

References

External links

2017
November 2017 sports events in Canada
2017 in Canadian curling
Sport in Sault Ste. Marie, Ontario
Curling in Northern Ontario
2017 in Ontario